Zandale is a neighborhood in southeastern Lexington, Kentucky, United States. Its boundaries are Nicholasville Road to the west, Zandale Drive to the north, Bellefonte Drive to the east, and a combination of Larkin Road, Heather Way, Melbourne Way, and Lowry Lane to the south.

Neighborhood statistics

 Area: 
 Population: 799
 Population density: 4,136 people per square mile
 Median household income (2010): $35,712

References

Neighborhoods in Lexington, Kentucky